Kálmán Latabár (1902–1970) was a Hungarian comedian and film actor, perhaps the country's most popular comic in the post-war years. "Latyi" reached his peak popularity during the war years and in the early days of Hungarian television, doing stand-up comedy, operettas and musicals, and comic routines in variety shows. A talented song-and-dance man, he had impeccable comic timing. Later in life he made several successful tours in Western Europe, Israel and America, idolized by the émigré Hungarian community. He was also a regular on the numerous theater stages of Budapest and of the provincial cities of the country.

Selected filmography
 Sportszerelem (Sports Love) (1936)
 Hol alszunk vasárnap? (Where Do We Sleep on Sunday?) (1937)
 Cserebere (Swapping) (1940)
 Mickey Magnate (1949)
 Zold, sárga, piros (Green, Yellow, Red) (1948)
 Janika (1949)
 A Képzett beteg (The Imaginary Invalid) (1952)
 The State Department Store (1953)
 Irány Mexikó! (Direction Mexico) (1968)

References

External links
 

1902 births
1970 deaths
People from Kecskemét
Hungarian Jews
Hungarian male film actors
20th-century Hungarian male actors
Burials at Farkasréti Cemetery